The Spartan-V is a high performance two-seat track car made by the Spartan Motor Company based in Sydney, Australia. It is powered by a  Ducati V-Twin motorcycle engine. Its name refers to the car's lack of headlights, indicators and several other essential features required by law in most countries, so is for track use only and can not be used on public roads.

Origins
Twin brothers Peter and Nick Pap started work that led to the Spartan-V in 2005.

Design 

The Spartan-V has a tubular steel spaceframe chassis with engine and 6-speed sequential gearbox from a Ducati 1198S. Designed for race track use, the Spartan has two chrome roll bars which can be removed and replaced with an FIA-approved single roll bar for competition use. Ducati digital instrumentation, ventilated brake discs, a quick ratio steering rack, and a limited slip differential ensures that power is still applied as long there is some traction available on at least one of the wheels. The body panels are made of carbon fibre fitted with quick-release fasteners. Suspension is double-wishbone, with adjustable racing shock absorbers.

Performance

A limited production run of 300 cars is planned to capitalise on the connection with The 300 Spartans who fought to the last man at the Battle of Thermopylae.

References

External links
 Official Company website
 Spartan-V Gallery
 Picture of Spartan-V

Sports cars
Cars of Australia
2000s cars